Carl Bertelsen (15 November 1937 – 11 June 2019) was a Danish footballer.

During his club career he played for Haderslev FK, Esbjerg fB, Morton, Dundee, Kilmarnock and OB. He earned 20 caps for the Denmark national football team, and was in the finals squad for the 1964 European Nations' Cup.

References

External links
Profile at DBU

1937 births
2019 deaths
Danish men's footballers
Danish expatriate men's footballers
Denmark international footballers
1964 European Nations' Cup players
Expatriate footballers in Scotland
Esbjerg fB players
Greenock Morton F.C. players
Dundee F.C. players
Kilmarnock F.C. players
Odense Boldklub players
People from Haderslev Municipality
Association football midfielders
Sportspeople from the Region of Southern Denmark